New Holstein Municipal Airport  is a city-owned public-use airport located one nautical mile (2 km) west of the central business district of New Holstein, a city in Calumet County, Wisconsin, United States. The airport is located on the west edge of the city on County Highway H. It is included in the Federal Aviation Administration (FAA) National Plan of Integrated Airport Systems for 2021–2025, in which it is categorized as a basic general aviation facility.

Facilities and aircraft 
New Holstein Municipal Airport covers an area of 267 acres (108 ha) at an elevation of 992 feet (302 m) above mean sea level. It has two runways: 14/32 is 3,600 by 75 feet (1,097 x 23 m) with an asphalt surface and 4/22 is 2,951 by 250 feet (899 x 76 m) with a turf surface.

The main runway was paved in 1958.

Welch's Aviation Services is the fixed-base operator.

For the 12-month period ending June 10, 2020, the airport had 7,900 aircraft operations, an average of 22 per day: 94% general aviation, 3% air taxi and 3% military. In January 2023, there were 19 aircraft based at this airport: all 19 single-engine.

The airport was closed while runway 14/32 was reconstructed between August 22, 2017, and November 10, 2017. The runway received new lighting, pavement and a precision approach path indicator guidance system; the project cost $1.65 million.

See also
List of airports in Wisconsin

References

External links 
 Airport page at City of New Holstein website
  at Wisconsin DOT Airport Directory
 

Airports in Wisconsin
Buildings and structures in Calumet County, Wisconsin